Franz Konrad or Conrad may refer to:

 Franz Konrad von Stadion und Thannhausen (1679–1757), Prince-Bishop of Bamberg
 Franz Konrad von Rodt (1706–1775), Bishop of Constance
 Franz Conrad von Hötzendorf (1852–1925), Chief of the General Staff of the Austro-Hungarian Army at the outbreak of World War I
 Franz Konrad (SS officer) (1906–1952)
 Franz Konrad (racing driver) (born 1951)